The following is a list of Canadian specialty channels, premium television services, and most other channels not available via terrestrial television.

English

Entertainment

 ABC Spark
 Adult Swim
 AMI-tv
 BBC First
 CTV Comedy Channel
 CTV Drama Channel
 CTV Sci-Fi Channel
 CMT
 Crime & Investigation
 DejaView
 E!
 FEVA TV
 FX
 FXX
 Game+
 GameTV
 Lifetime
 MTV
 MTV2
 Much
 Showcase

Kids 

 Cartoon Network
 Disney Channel 
 Disney Junior
 Disney XD
 Family Channel
 Family Jr.
 Nickelodeon
 Teletoon
 Toon-A-Vision
 Treehouse TV
 WildBrainTV
 YTV

Factual 

 Animal Planet
 BBC Earth
 Discovery Channel
 Discovery Science
 Discovery Velocity
 History
 History2
 Investigation Discovery
 Love Nature
 Nat Geo Wild
 National Geographic
 Smithsonian Channel

Lifestyle

 Cooking Channel
 Cottage Life
 CTV Life Channel
 DTour
 Food Network
 HGTV
 Magnolia Network
 Makeful
 OLN
 One
 Oprah Winfrey Network
 OutTV
 RFD-TV Canada
 Slice
 T+E
 The Rural Channel
 VisionTV
 W Network
 Water Television Network

Movie channels
 Documentary Channel
 MovieTime
 Rewind
 Silver Screen Classics
 The Cult Movie Network

Premium
 Crave
 Crave 2
 Crave 3
 Crave 4 (2hr time-shifted feed of Crave 1)
 HBO Canada
 HBO 2
 Starz Canada
 Starz 2
 Hollywood Suite
 70s Movies
 80s Movies
 90s Movies
 00s Movies
 Super Channel
 Super Channel Fuse
 Super Channel Heart & Home
 Super Channel Vault
 Ginx eSports TV Canada

Music
 Stingray Country
 Stingray Juicebox
 Stingray Loud
 Stingray Retro
 Stingray Naturescape
 Stingray Now 4K
 Stingray Vibe
 XITE 4K

News, weather, and information

National
 BNN Bloomberg
 CBC News Network
 CPAC - English feed
 CTV News Channel
 The News Forum
 The Weather Network

Regional
 CP24
 Global News: BC 1

Premium adult services
 AOV Adult Movie Channel
 Dorcel TV Canada
 Exxxtasy TV
 Maleflixxx Television
 Penthouse TV
 Playmen TV
 Red Hot TV
 Skinemax HD
 Vixen TV
 XXX Action Clips Channel

Provincial parliamentary channels
 Hansard TV (British Columbia)
 House of Assembly Channel (Newfoundland & Labrador)
 Legislative Television (Nova Scotia)
 Ontario Parliament Network  (Ontario)
 Saskatchewan Legislative Network (Saskatchewan)
 The Legislative Assembly of New Brunswick Television Service

Religious
 Daystar Television Canada
 Salt + Light Television
 Vertical TV

Shopping
 TSC

Sports
 ATN Cricket Plus
 ATN DD Sports
 beIN Sports
 The Cowboy Channel Canada
 ESPN Classic
 EuroWorld Sport
 Fight Network
 HPItv
 HPItv Canada
 HPItv International
 HPItv West
 NBA TV Canada
 OneSoccer
 REV TV Canada
 Sportsman Channel
 Sportsnet
 Sportsnet East
 Sportsnet Ontario
 Sportsnet Pacific
 Sportsnet West
 Sportsnet 360
 Sportsnet One
 Sportsnet Flames
 Sportsnet Oilers
 Sportsnet Vancouver Hockey
 Sportsnet World
 The Sports Network
 TSN2
 TSN3
 TSN4
 TSN5
 Wild TV
 Willow Canada (cricket)
 WWE Network

French

Entertainment
 addikTV
 Elle Fictions
 Max
 Prise 2
 SériesPlus
 TV5 Québec Canada
 Unis
 Vrak
Z

Youth 
 La Chaîne Disney
 Télémagino
 Télétoon
 Yoopa

Factual
 Canal D
 Historia
Ici ARTV
 Ici Explora
 Investigation

Lifestyle
 Casa
 Canal Vie
 Évasion
 Moi et Ce
 Zeste

Movie channels
 Cinépop
 Frissons TV
 Super Écran
 Super Écran 2
 Super Écran 3
 Super Écran 4

Music 

 PalmarèsADISQ par Stingray
 Stingray Hits!

News, weather, and information
 Avis de Recherche
 CPAC - French feed
 LCN
 MétéoMédia
 Ici RDI

Premium adult services
 Dorcel TV Canada

Provincial parliamentary channels
 Canal de l'Assemblée nationale (Quebec)

Sports
 RDS
 RDS2
 RDS Info
 TVA Sports
 TVA Sports 2

Multicultural

 Aaj Tak
 Abu Dhabi TV
 Afroglobal Television
 Al-Nahar TV
 Al-Nahar Drama
 Al Resalah
 All TV
 All TV K
 APTN
 ATN Aastha TV
 ATN ABP Sanjha
 ATN ARY Digital
 ATN B4U Movies
 ATN B4U Music
 ATN B4U Plus
 ATN Bangla
 ATN Brit Asia TV
 ATN Channel
 ATN Colors Bangla
 ATN Colors Marathi
 ATN Colors Rishtey
 ATN DD Bharati
 ATN DD India
 ATN DD News
 ATN DD Urdu
 ATN Food Food
 ATN Gujarati
 ATN IBC Tamil
 ATN Jaya TV
 ATN Life
 ATN Movies
 ATN MTV India
 ATN News
 ATN News 18
 ATN PM One
 ATN Punjabi
 ATN Punjabi 5
 ATN Punjabi News
 ATN Punjabi Plus
 ATN SAB TV
 ATN Sikh Channel
 ATN Sony Aath
 ATN Sony Max
 ATN Sony Max 2
 ATN Sony TV
 ATN SVBC
 ATN Tamil Plus
 ATN Times Now
 ATN Urdu
 ATN Zoom
 BBC Arabic
 CBN
 Canale IV
 Canada Chinese TV
 Canada National TV
 CCCTV
 Chakde TV
 Channel Punjabi
 Channel Y
 Dream 2
 ERT World
 First National
 FPTV
 FTV
 Fairchild TV
 Fairchild TV 2 HD
 Filmy
 Greek Music Channel
 Halla Bol!
 HRT Sat
 Hum TV
 Inuit TV
 The Israeli Network
 LS Times TV
 Mediaset Italia
 Mediaset TGCOM 24
 MEGA Cosmos
 Melody Aflam
 Melody Drama
 Melody Hits
 Momo Kids
 Montreal Greek TV
 NGTV
 New Tang Dynasty Television
 Odyssey
 OSN Ya Hala International
 Prime Asia TV
 ProSiebenSat.1 Welt
 PTC Punjabi
 Rawal TV
 Rotana Aflam
 Rotana Cinema
 Rotana Classic
 Rotana Clip
 Rotana Drama
 Rotana Khalijiah
 Rotana Mousica
 RTS Sat
 RTVi
 Schlager TV
 SSTV
 Tamil One
 Tamil Vision
 Talentvision
 Telebimbi
 TeleNiños
 TET
 TLN
 Travelxp
 TVCentr International
 TVP Info
 Univision Canada
 VGN TV
 Vanakkam TV
 Win HD Caribbean
 WOWtv
 Zee 24 Taas
 Zee Bangla
 Zee Bollywood
 Zee Cinema
 Zee Marathi
 Zee Punjabi
 Zee Salaam
 Zee Talkies
 Zee Tamil
 Zee TV Canada
 Zing

Defunct cable/satellite networks

 A.Side TV
 Action
 Argent
 ATN NDTV 24x7
 BBC Canada
 BBC Kids
 The Biography Channel
 Bloomberg TV Canada 
 BookTelevision
 bpm:tv
 Bollywood Times
 BuyNOW TV
 CBC Parliamentary Television Network
 C Channel
 CityNews Channel
 Comedy Gold
 CoolTV
 Cosmopolitan TV
 DealsTV
 Discovery Kids
 Dusk
 The Ecology Channel
 Edge TV
 Encore Avenue
 Fashion Television
 Fine Living
 Fox Sports World Canada
 FYI
 G4
 Global Reality Channel
 GolTV
 HSTN
 ichannel
 IFC
 Iran TV Network
 Leafs Nation Network
 Leonardo World
 The Life Channel
 M3
 MEGA Cosmos (ECG)
 Mehndi TV
 Movie Central
 MSNBC Canada
 Niagara News TV
 Nuevo Mundo Television
 The Pet Network
 Persian Vision
 RBTI Canada
 RTVi+
 ShopTV Canada
 Sun News Network
 Sundance Channel
 Talentvision 2 HD
 TATV
 Télé Achats
 Teletoon Retro
 Télétoon Rétro
 Tonis
 TVOne Canada
 UTV Movies
 Viceland
 Video Italia
 Vintage TV
 WTSN
 X-Treme Sports

See also
 List of Canadian television channels
 List of HD channels in Canada
 Category A services
 Category B services
 Category C services
 List of foreign television channels available in Canada
 List of United States stations available in Canada

Lists of television channels in Canada
Mass media regulation in Canada
Cable television in Canada